= Esfandaqeh Castle =

Castle in Kerman Province, Iran

Esfandaqeh castle
- قلعه اسفندقه

General information
- Type: Castle
- Location: Jiroft County, Iran

Esfandaqeh castle (Persian: قلعه اسفندقه) is a historical castle located in Jiroft County in Kerman Province, The longevity of this fortress dates back to the Pahlavi dynasty.
